Luis Arana Mendívil was a Spanish footballer who played as a goalkeeper who won the 1902 Copa de la Coronación with Club Bizcaya.

Biography
Together with his brothers José María, Amado and Mario, he was one of the first pioneers of football in Bilbao, being one of the young sportsmen from the city's high society who at the end of 1900, formed the Bilbao Football Club, with whom he played several friendly matches against city rivals Athletic Club (now known as Athletic Bilbao) in the Hippodrome of Lamiako. In 1902, the two rivals agreed to join the best players of each club to face the Bordeaux-based side Burdigala at Burdeos, France, which marked the first time a Bilbao team played on foreign territory. This temporary merge became known as Club Bizcaya and Arana ousted Athletic's goalkeeper to be part of the first-ever line-up of the Bizcaya team that faced Burdigala on 9 March, keeping a clean-sheet in an 0–2 away win.

Together with Juan Astorquia, Alejandro de la Sota and William Dyer, he was part of the Bizcaya team that won the 1902 Copa de la Coronación, featuring in the final contributing decisively to a 2–1 win over FC Barcelona.

Honours
Copa de la Coronación: 1902

References

Year of birth missing
Year of death missing
Spanish footballers
Athletic Bilbao footballers
Association football goalkeepers
Footballers from Bilbao